The Utah Tech Trailblazers basketball statistical leaders are individual statistical leaders of the Utah Tech Trailblazers men's basketball program in various categories, including points, rebounds, assists, steals, and blocks. Within those areas, the lists identify single-game, single-season, and career leaders. The Trailblazers represent Utah Tech University, formerly Dixie State University, in the NCAA Division I Western Athletic Conference.

Utah Tech(then Dixie State) began competing in NCAA basketball in 2006.   These lists are updated through the end of the 2020–21 season.

Scoring

Rebounds

Assists

Steals

Blocks

References

Lists of college basketball statistical leaders by team
Statistical